"Made in America" is the series finale of the HBO drama series The Sopranos. It is the 86th episode of the series, the ninth episode of the second part of the show's sixth season, and the 21st episode of the season overall. Written and directed by series creator, executive producer and showrunner David Chase, it first aired in the United States on June 10, 2007. The final scene that cuts to black has drawn various interpretations regarding the ultimate fate of Tony Soprano; Chase has made varied comments about his intentions for the scene.

Synopsis
Tony remains in hiding with his crew. He meets FBI Agent Harris and gives him information about Ahmed and Muhammad in exchange for Phil's location, but Harris does not know anything. Tony visits his family in their safe house and later joins them at Bobby's funeral. Tony then visits Janice at her house, and she tells him she will raise Bobby's children, oblivious to how much they hate her. Later, Harris informs Tony that Phil has been using payphones from gas stations in Oyster Bay, Long Island, and Tony's crew begins surveilling the area.

Phil calls Butchie from a payphone, expresses anger about his failure to kill Tony, and rejects Butchie's suggestion to make peace. He also darkly tells Butchie that he will face punishment for his ineffectiveness after Tony is dead. Tony meets with Butchie to negotiate without Phil's knowledge. Butchie refuses to disclose his boss's location, but agrees to a truce and allows Tony to order a hit on Phil, and they also agree to make restitution to Bobby's family. Shortly after, Tony and his family move back into their North Caldwell home. Meanwhile, Benny and Walden spot Phil and shoot him dead at a gas station.

A.J. tells his parents he intends to join the Army, but they arrange for him to work for Little Carmine's film production company instead. Meadow and Patrick Parisi announce their engagement and that Meadow may land a high-paying job at a law firm that defends white collar criminals, to Tony’s disappointment. Tony visits the comatose Silvio in the hospital.

Carlo goes missing, and Paulie fears he may have become an informant after his son Jason Gervasi was arrested on a drug-related charge. Tony's lawyer, Neil Mink, tells Tony that Carlo is likely testifying and that Tony will be indicted. With Carlo gone, Tony offers the leadership of the Aprile crew to Paulie, who initially rejects the offer before reluctantly accepting.

Janice meets Junior in his care home to tell him of Bobby's death, but Junior's dementia leaves him too confused to understand. Uncle Pat tells Tony he believes Janice is scheming to claim Junior's remaining money for herself. Tony visits Junior and tells him to give the money to Bobby's children, but realizes Junior no longer knows who he is. When Tony tries to remind Junior of his mafia life and how he and his brother "ran North Jersey", Junior replies, "Well, that's nice." A teary-eyed Tony leaves.

The Sopranos arrange to meet at a diner. Tony tells Carmela that Carlo will testify, while A.J. reminds his father of his advice to "remember the good times." Meadow arrives late after having trouble parking her car. As the diner door opens, the bell rings and Tony looks up. The screen cuts to black.

Starring
 James Gandolfini as Tony Soprano
 Lorraine Bracco as Dr. Jennifer Melfi *
 Edie Falco as Carmela Soprano
 Michael Imperioli as Christopher Moltisanti **
 Dominic Chianese as Corrado "Junior" Soprano
 Steven Van Zandt as Silvio Dante
 Tony Sirico as Paulie Gualtieri
 Robert Iler as Anthony Soprano, Jr. 
 Jamie-Lynn Sigler as Meadow Soprano
 Aida Turturro as Janice Soprano Baccalieri
 Frank Vincent as Phil Leotardo
 Ray Abruzzo as Little Carmine Lupertazzi
 Dan Grimaldi as Patsy Parisi
 Sharon Angela as Rosalie Aprile
 Maureen Van Zandt as Gabriella Dante
* = credit only
** = photo only

Guest starring

Deceased
 Phil Leotardo: Shot to death by Walden Belfiore

Production

Conception
Showrunner David Chase planned the series ending and the final scene during the 21-month hiatus between seasons 5 and 6, a long break HBO had granted him. The final scene was filmed almost exactly as Chase had envisioned. It was not intended as a setup for a future film, although Chase later commented "[t]here may be a day where we all come up with something," regarding a possible Sopranos feature, which was announced in March 2018 as a prequel titled The Many Saints of Newark. It was then-HBO chairman Chris Albrecht who suggested to Chase to conclude the series with the sixth season.

Writing
As with every episode of the season, the plot outline of "Made in America" was developed by Chase and his writing staff, which for the final season consisted of executive producers Terence Winter and Matthew Weiner, and supervising producers and writing team Diane Frolov and Andrew Schneider. Frequent episode director Tim Van Patten also provided Chase with some storyline suggestions. After the episode's story had been outlined, Chase wrote the first draft. After some input from his writing staff, Chase revised the script to its finished state, although he also made minor changes during filming. "Made in America" is Chase's 30th and final official writing credit (including story credits) for the series and his ninth as sole writer of an episode.

Chase included allusions to real-life American Mafia history and events in the script for "Made in America", something he is well known for. Specifically, the line "Damn! We're gonna win this thing!", spoken in the episode by the character Dwight Harris after being informed of the death of Phil Leotardo, alludes to former FBI supervisor Lindley DeVecchio. DeVecchio famously uttered the line after being told that Lorenzo "Larry" Lampasi had been shot to death in front of his Brooklyn home and was later charged for informing the Mafia on various accounts, another parallel to Tony Soprano and Dwight Harris.

Filming

"Made in America" was directed by Chase and photographed by Alik Sakharov. The two served in the same capacities for the pilot episode, "The Sopranos", which was filmed in 1997. The series finale marks the second time Chase has officially directed an episode of The Sopranos, although as showrunner, he would oversee the direction of most episodes throughout the show's production. "Made in America" marks the 38th and final credit for Sakharov as director of photography.

Principal photography commenced in late February and concluded in late March 2007. Exterior scenes and certain interior scenes of "Made in America" were filmed on location in Bergen County, New Jersey, and in Brooklyn and Manhattan, New York City, New York. Additional interior scenes—including indoor shots of the Soprano residence and the back room of the strip club Bada Bing!—were filmed in a sound stage in Silvercup Studios in Long Island City, Queens, New York, where most such scenes of the series had been filmed.

The final scene of the episode was filmed in late March 2007 at Holsten's Brookdale Confectionery, an ice cream and candy shop located in Bloomfield, New Jersey. The Bloomfield Township Council initially tried to stop HBO from filming in the town because "[they] found the HBO mob drama offensive to Italian-Americans" and voted to deny the production company a filming permit. As the council had no authority to stop filming in the town as long as the crew met the requirements stated in Bloomfield's code for filming crews, a permit was issued.

As the show's producers needed to ensure that plot details of the ending would be kept a secret until the airdate, the scripts given to the crew members had their final pages removed. The final scene of these edited scripts was the one in which Tony is raking leaves outside his house, a scene that occurs 10 minutes before the real ending in the final cut. Chase received compliments for this scene from people who thought it was the real ending. The scene where Phil Leotardo was shot and killed was filmed in Morris Plains, New Jersey.

Post-production
"Made in America" was edited by Sidney Wolinsky, one of the show's three editors, under the supervision of Chase. 
Chase originally wanted the black screen at the end of the episode to last "all the way to the HBO whoosh sound," meaning that no credits would roll at the end of the episode but did not receive a waiver from the Directors Guild of America to do so.

Music
In the final scene of the series, Little Feat's "All That You Dream" is playing over Holstens' P.A. as Tony enters the diner ahead of Carmela, A.J. and Meadow.  "Don't Stop Believin'" is played throughout the rest of the scene. Journey's lead singer Steve Perry initially refused to let David Chase use the song until he knew the fate of the leading characters and did not give final approval until three days before the episode aired. Perry feared that the song would be remembered as the soundtrack to Tony's demise until Chase assured him that would not be the case. Immediately following the airing of "Made in America," the song enjoyed a great surge of popularity; its sales on iTunes, for example, grew 482 percent. The newly growing attention to the band helped it climb out of the reportedly difficult times it was having at the time.

Interpretations of the final scene

The final scene of "Made in America" became the subject of much discussion, controversy, and analysis after its original broadcast. The use of an abrupt cut to black followed by several seconds of silence led many viewers to initially believe that their cable or DVR had cut out at a crucial moment.
Opposing interpretations soon emerged among viewers regarding the ultimate fate of series protagonist Tony Soprano, with some believing that he was killed while others believe that he remains alive.

One argument for the former points to a conversation that Tony had in the midseason premiere episode "Soprano Home Movies" with his brother-in-law Bobby, in which Bobby comments on how suddenly and without sound death can happen in their lives as gangsters: "You probably don't even hear it when it happens, right?" A flashback to this scene also appears in the final minutes of "The Blue Comet", the episode preceding "Made in America". When questioned on the theory, HBO spokesman Quentin Schaffer stated that the conversation is a "legitimate" hint.

Also, Butchie DeConcini (the presumed successor of Phil Leotardo) was last seen saddled with reparations following the mob war. He had expressed ideas about killing Tony before ("Kaisha"), and Tony was, in the end, the very last DiMeo man left standing out of the three original Lupertazzi targets, who, Phil believed, if killed, would totally cripple the Jersey family. Hence, Tony would have been a tempting target of a hit. The final scene showing a man who glances at Tony (credited as "Man in Members Only Jacket") and who later goes to the bathroom, has been interpreted as a nod to the famous scene in The Godfather in which Michael Corleone retrieves a gun from the bathroom before shooting his enemies to death (Tony's favorite scene from the film, as revealed in the episode "Johnny Cakes").

Speculation has also linked the jacket of the man to the title of the opening episode of the season, "Members Only", in which Tony is shot, and also as a symbolic reference to the mysterious man's membership of the Mafia. Actor Matt Servitto said that in the script, the scene continued with the man in the Members Only jacket emerging from the bathroom and starting to walk towards Tony's table. Servitto later clarified this statement, saying that he did not mean to imply that there was a completely different scripted ending, only that the "genius" editing was not what he had expected.

Other viewers offer opposing interpretations. It has been suggested that the final scene portrays that, while Tony's life is fraught with fear and danger, which could come from anyone anywhere, and that while Tony has to constantly watch his back and look out for any emerging trouble (he keeps an eye on the diner entrance), life nevertheless goes on and the viewer simply does not get to continue seeing it. The lyrics of the closing song, seemingly telling the viewer "Don't stop believin'," are thought to support this, while the silent black screen space before the credits is meant to allow people to imagine and believe in their own continuations of Tony's story.
It can be stated that because of Tony's peace agreement with the Lupertazzi family, their tacit sanction of a hit on Phil, and Butchie's visible unwillingness to continue the hostilities, there was little legitimate basis to expect a hit on Tony from the Lupertazzis and the threat to him, although always present, was not higher than usual.

Comments from David Chase
Chase has made various comments about the finale but has avoided providing an explanation to the meaning of the final scene. In his first interview after the broadcast of the finale with the New Jersey paper The Star-Ledger, Chase stated,

Chase also addressed the opinion of some that the open-ended finale was insulting to the show's longtime fans: 

In an interview conducted by Brett Martin several weeks after the finale's original broadcast, Chase shared his views on the final episode and the reaction to it. On those fans of the show who demanded an unambiguous and definitive ending, Chase remarked,
 Chase also made comments about the purported lack of finality in the final episode:  On the future of the Soprano children, Chase said,  On moments during and after the final scene, Chase referred to a scene from the episode "Stage 5": 
 In a December 2008 radio interview with Richard Belzer, Chase also mentioned the scenes from "Stage 5" and "Soprano Home Movies" in relation to the final scene.

At the 2008 TCA Awards, held on July 22, Chase commented,I wasn't going to do this, but somebody said it would be a good idea if we said something about that ending. I really wasn't going to go into it, but I'll just say this... when I was going to Stanford University's graduate film school and was 23, I went to see Planet of the Apes with my wife. When it was over, I said, "Wow... so they had a Statue of Liberty, too." So that's what you're up against.
In a November 2008 interview with Entertainment Weekly's Steve Daly, Chase stated, 

Chase revisited the final scene in an April 2015 interview with DGA Quarterly and "suggested that fans, experts, and scholars have been over-thinking the ending to the show."    "The ceiling I was going for at that point, the biggest feeling I was going for, honestly, was don't stop believing. It was very simple and much more on the nose than people think. That's what I wanted people to believe. That life ends and death comes, but don't stop believing.

    There are attachments we make in life, even though it's all going to come to an end, that are worth so much, and we're so lucky to have been able to experience them. Life is short.

    Either it ends here for Tony or some other time. But in spite of that, it's really worth it. So don't stop believing."

In response to reports that Chase has offered a definitive answer to the question of whether Tony Soprano lived or died, at the show's conclusion, Chase has issued denials indicating such reports were incorrect and reiterated the stance he has consistently taken on the subject, and publications have printed retractions.

In a January 2019 interview with Alan Sepinwall and Matt Zoller Seitz for their book The Sopranos Sessions, Chase inadvertently referred to the final scene as "that death scene". Seitz asked Chase if he was aware of his choice of words to which the latter, after a long pause, responded, "Fuck you guys." Chase went on to reveal that he "didn't want to do a straight death scene", after originally envisioning Tony's death occurring in a meeting with Johnny Sack. Chase later clarified his statement, saying he was not describing the Holsten's scene as "that death scene" but an earlier idea that he had abandoned.

During a November 2021 interview with The Hollywood Reporter, Chase made comments that some interpreted as confirmation that Tony Soprano dies in the final cut to black. He had originally envisioned a scene in which Tony would drive from New Jersey to New York, the reverse of the route followed in the opening sequence of every episode, and arrive at a meeting in which he would be killed. After driving past a small restaurant on Ocean Park Boulevard, though, Chase decided that Tony should instead "get it in a place like that".

Reception

Ratings
According to Nielsen ratings, an average of 11.9 million viewers watched "Made in America" on its United States premiere date Sunday, June 10, 2007. This was a 49% increase from the previous episode and the show's best ratings for both parts of the sixth season. It was also the show's largest audience since the season five premiere.

Response

Initial
"Made in America" received mainly favorable to semi-favorable initial reviews from critics, while early fan reception was mixed to negative, described by one critic as "a mixture of admiration and anger". During the weeks following the episode's original broadcast, "Made in America" and its closing scene, in particular, became the subject of much discussion and analysis. Several new interpretations and explanations of the ending were presented in magazines and on blogs, which led many critics and fans to reevaluate the ending.

Marisa Carroll of PopMatters awarded "Made in America" a score of 8 out of 10 and particularly praised the final scene as one of the best of the series.

Mark Farinella  of The Sun Chronicle called the episode "[a] perfect ending to a perfect TV series."

Owen Gleiberman of Entertainment Weekly called "Made in America" "the perfect ending" and wrote about the final scene, "On shock of that cut to black, the marvelous way it got you to roll the scene over, again and again, in your mind's eye. [sic] Rather than bringing the series to a close, that blackout made The Sopranos live forever."

Tim Goodman of the San Francisco Chronicle characterized the finale as "[a]n ending befitting genius of Sopranos" and wrote that "Chase managed, with this ending, to be true to reality [...] while also steering clear of trite TV conventions."

Frazier Moore of the Associated Press called the episode "brilliant" and wrote that "Chase was true to himself."

Kim Reed of Television Without Pity gave "Made in America" the highest score of A+ and praised it for staying true to the show.

Alan Sepinwall of The Star-Ledger called the finale "satisfying" and wrote that the episode "fit[s] perfectly with everything Chase has done on this show before."

Chicago Tribune critic Maureen Ryan's first review was mixed; she criticized the final scene for not providing any closure. Ryan later wrote: "Chase got me totally wound up, then ripped me away from that world. I was really mad at first [...] I still think what Chase did was, all due respect, kind of jerky. But minutes after the finale ended, I started laughing."

Retrospective
Retrospective reviews of "Made in America" have been highly positive; the episode has been included on several lists of the best series finales of all time. Alan Sepinwall of The Star-Ledger wrote, in an essay analyzing the finale one year after its original broadcast, that he felt the episode was "brilliant."

In 2009, Arlo J. Wiley of Blogcritics wrote: "by focusing on that last ambiguous parting shot from creator David Chase, we run the risk of forgetting just how beautifully structured and executed an hour of television 'Made in America' is" and ranked it as the eighth-best series finale ever.

Also in 2009, Stacey Wilson of Film.com named "Made in America" one of the 10 best series finales of all time and wrote: "Crude, rude and no time for emotional B.S., this finale was a delicious end to a show that reveled in the ugliness of humanity."

TV Guide included "Made in America" in their "TV's Best Finales Ever" feature, writing: "What's there to say about this finale that hasn't already been said? The much-anticipated closer had everyone waiting to see if Tony was finally going to go from whacker to whackee. Instead, they got Journey, a greasy plate of onion rings and a black screen. But, the fact that we're still talking about it proves—for better or worse—that the episode did its job."

In 2011, the finale was ranked #2 on the TV Guide Network special TV's Most Unforgettable Finales.

Awards
In 2007, "Made in America" won an Emmy Award in the category of Outstanding Writing for a Drama Series at the 59th Primetime Emmy Awards. It was the only category the episode was nominated in. This is the third and final time series creator/executive producer David Chase won the award for his writing of the series.

In 2008, Chase was nominated for a Directors Guild of America Award in the category of Drama Series (Night) but lost to fellow Sopranos director Alan Taylor, who won for directing the pilot episode of Mad Men, a series created by former Sopranos writer Matthew Weiner.

Also in 2008, editor Sidney Wolinsky won an American Cinema Editors Eddie Award in the category of Best Edited One-Hour Series for Non-Commercial Television.

References

External links
"Made in America"  at HBO

The Sopranos (season 6) episodes
2007 American television episodes
American television series finales
Emmy Award-winning episodes
Television episodes written by David Chase
Television episodes directed by David Chase